Ivor Parry Evans (February 20, 1923, Aliquippa, Pennsylvania – October 24, 2009, Abilene, Texas) was a United States Air Force officer and commander.

Career

Evans served as a bombardier on B-25 aircraft in the U.S. Army Air Corps in North Africa, Italy, and Corsica during World War II. He was a bombardier on B-36 aircraft in the Strategic Air Command.  As such, he and his crew won the 1955 bombing competition for all of SAC.  He was Assistant Director of Operations for the 821st Air Division at Ellsworth Air Force Base, during the Cuban Missile Crisis.  He later became Base Commander of Walker Air Force Base in Roswell, New Mexico from 1963 to 1965.

Awards and citations
Evans was awarded the Air Medal by Headquarters of Twelfth Air Force while serving as a First Lieutenant in the 321st Bombardment Group (Medium).  The citation reads:

For meritorious achievement while participating in aerial flight as bombardier of a B-25 type aircraft.  On 30 January 1944, Lieutenant Evans flew as lead bombardier of a thirty-three plane formation attacking a road junction at Genzano, near Anzio beach, Italy.  Despite intense anti-aircraft fire which heavily damaged his airplane upon the approach to the target, Lieutenant Evans, displaying outstanding courage and professional skill, directed his pilot on a perfect run over the objective, thereby enabling the formation to release its bombs with devastating effect upon this vital link in enemy communication lines.  His proficiency in combat reflects great credit upon himself and the armed forces of the United States. 

Evans was later awarded the Distinguished Flying Cross for his attack upon a railroad bridge near Attigliano, Italy on April 17, 1944.

He was decorated for actions during the Battle of Anzio in early 1944, and received the U.S. Distinguished Flying Cross and Air Medal. After the war he served as bombardier on B-36 aircraft and radar navigator on B-52 aircraft in the Strategic Air Command in addition to being the winner of the 1955 SAC bombing competition and later Base commander, Walker Air Force Base, Roswell, New Mexico.

References

1923 births
2009 deaths
United States Army Air Forces personnel of World War II
United States Air Force officers
Recipients of the Distinguished Flying Cross (United States)
People from Aliquippa, Pennsylvania
Recipients of the Air Medal
United States Army Air Forces officers
Military personnel from Pennsylvania